The following highways are numbered 852:

United States